The Molasse Coquilliere is a geologic formation in France. It preserves fossils dating back to the Neogene period, which started 23.03 million years ago and ended 2.58 million years ago.

See also

 List of fossiliferous stratigraphic units in France

External links
 

Neogene France